James Bushell "Scotty" McArthur (April 4, 1900 – November 18, 1984) was an American football coach. He was the seventh head football coach at The Apprentice School in Newport News, Virginia and he held that position for the 1932 season.  His coaching record at Apprentice was 5–4.

References

1900 births
1984 deaths
The Apprentice Builders football coaches